Tanara is a district in the Banten province on the island of Java, Indonesia.

The Ci Durian, a river, enters the Java Sea at Tanara.
As of 2010 the district was divided into the following villages:

Notes

Sources

Districts of Banten